Al Salam Tower is a  skyscraper located on Sheikh Zayed Road in Dubai, United Arab Emirates.  The 49-storey building is occupied by Al Salam Hotel Suites, a deluxe serviced apartment tower now managed by SRG Hospitality, a subsidiary of SRG Holding Limited, the developer and owning company of.  

Al Salam Tower is the 47th-tallest building in Dubai, and one of the tallest residential buildings in the world. When completed in 2005, Al Salam Tower was the fifth-tallest building in the city.

Al Salam Tower used to be known as Chelsea Tower as it was previously leased and operated by Chelsea Hotel Group. During its construction took over name of 'Al Salam Tower II' after its older next door building Union Tower, which underwent construction as 'Al Salam Tower' Project but it changed its name after purchase.

See also 
 List of tallest buildings in Dubai

External links 
 
 Chelsea Tower on Emporis
 Chelsea Tower on SkyscraperPage

Buildings and structures completed in 2005
Skyscraper hotels in Dubai
Residential skyscrapers in Dubai